Chabertia may refer to:
 Chabertia (plant), a genus of plants in the family Rosaceae
 Chabertia (nematode), a genus of parasitic roundworms in the family Chabertiidae